Bullseye is an American game show on Fox hosted by action star Kellan Lutz and comedian Godfrey. The show features contestants who compete in extreme challenges in order to hit or come the closest to the bullseye. The first episode premiered on Wednesday, May 27, 2015, at 9:00 pm EDT. The first season concluded on July 15, 2015.

On August 21, 2016, Bullseye was cancelled by FOX after one season.

Gameplay
In each episode, four women and four men compete in three "epic challenges" to hit, collect, or destroy bullseyes for a chance to win $50,000.

For the first challenge, placement is based on the contestants' distance from a bullseye, and the competition is separated by gender, with two men and two women being eliminated. The second is a challenge to claim as many targets as possible, and only the contestant in last place is eliminated. The final three competitors then race each other in a large course, and the person with the fastest time (or slowest depending on the challenge) after any applicable penalties (for example, for missing a target) wins that episode's money.

Episodes

References

External links
Official website

2010s American game shows
2015 American television series debuts
2015 American television series endings
English-language television shows
Fox Broadcasting Company original programming
Quiz shows
Television series by Endemol